The Darul Makmur Mosque is a mosque located at Yishun Avenue 2 in Yishun, Singapore. It was constructed in the early 1980s.

History
The plan to build a mosque in Yishun housing estate was developed in the 1980s. At the time, the total number of Muslim residents of Yishun stood at 102 individuals.

Local Muslim residents from Yishun and the surrounding villages met to form a Mosque Building Committee, propose a list of names to the Islamic Religious Council of Singapore (Muis) for its approval.

With support from Muis, funds began to be raised for the construction of mosque.

Some of the events, projects, and initiatives organized by the Committee included

Religious talks
Fixed Monthly Contributions
Jog-A-Walk
Charity Sale
Appeal letters to individuals, organisations, companies and Muslim bodies,
Placing donation boxes at other mosques in Singapore during Friday solat
Sale of donation coupons
Wakaf contribution for mosque facilities

Contributions 
Briyani Rice Charity Sale - S$40,000
Appeal letters - S$13,000
Donation boxes during Friday solat - S$28,000
Jog-A-Walk - S$85,000
Wakaf projects - S$30,000

The Committee also received compensation from the acquisition of musolahs (surau) in the nearby villages affected by the government’s resettlement projects which include

Surau Kg Tanjong Irau - S$32,667.18
Surau Jalan Mata Ayer - S$8,688.34
Surau Jalan Kemuning - S$4,929.45

Establishment 
Several names for the new mosque were suggested such as AI-Jannah, AI-Makmur, Assobirin, Faisah, AI-Bilal, AI-Muaasim, Aminin, AI-Syuhadah dan AI-Araf, but the Fatwa Committee's final verdict was Darul Makmur.

Alhamdulillah, with the conscientious efforts, contribution and support of the Mosque Building Committee and Muslim residents in Yishun and nearby areas, Darul Makmur Mosque construction was completed and officially launched on 25 July 1987. Eiduladha Prayers 1407H was the first congregational prayer held upon its completion.

Mosque Management Board

Darul Makmur Kindergarten
Pre School for Children from the age of 4 to 6 years old (Registered under Ministry of Education (Singapore))
Nursery for 4 yrs old, Kindergarten 1 for 5 yrs old & Kindergarten 2 for 6 yrs old
Function is to mould the young generation to be khalifahs / Good Muslim & focus on child’s need according to age groups
Staff Strength - 5 Pre School teachers and 1 Principal

Transportation
The mosque is accessible from Yishun MRT station.

See also
 Islam in Singapore

External links
Official website of Darul Makmur Mosque
Portal for Mosques in Singapore
GoogleMaps StreetView of Masjid Darul Makmur

1987 establishments in Singapore
Darul Makmur
Mosques completed in 1987
20th-century architecture in Singapore